Rueil-Malmaison is a commune in the western suburbs of Paris, in the Hauts-de-Seine department, Île-de-France region. In 2017, it had a population of 78,152. It is one of the wealthiest suburbs of Paris.

Name
Rueil-Malmaison was originally called simply Rueil. This name is made of the Celtic word  (meaning 'clearing, glade' or 'place of') suffixed to a radical meaning 'brook, stream', or maybe to a radical meaning 'ford' (Celtic ).

In 1928, the name of the commune officially became Rueil-Malmaison in reference to its most famous tourist attraction, the Château de Malmaison, home of Napoleon's first wife Joséphine de Beauharnais.

The name Malmaison comes from Medieval Latin , meaning 'ill-fated domain', 'estate of ill luck'. In the Early Middle Ages Malmaison was the site of a royal residence which was destroyed by the Vikings in 846.

History

The Rueil barracks of the Swiss Guard were constructed in 1756 under Louis XV by the architect Axel Guillaumot, and have been classified Monument historique since 1973. The Guard was formed by Louis XIII in 1616 and massacred at the Tuileries on 10 August 1792 during the French Revolution.

Rueil is famous for the Château de Malmaison where Napoleon and his first wife Joséphine de Beauharnais lived. Upon her death in 1814, she was buried at the nearby Saint-Pierre-Saint-Paul church, which stands at the centre of the city.

During the Franco-Prussian War of 1870, Rueil was located on the front line.

At the end of the 19th century, Impressionist painters like Pierre-Auguste Renoir, Édouard Manet and Claude Monet came to paint the Seine River which crosses the town.

Population

Sights
The Château de Malmaison, the residence of Napoléon's first wife Joséphine de Beauharnais, is located in Rueil-Malmaison. It is home to a  Napoleonic museum.

Economy

The main campus of the French Institute of Petroleum research organisation is in Rueil. The city has also become home to many large companies moving out of La Défense business district, located only  from Rueil, a trend first established by the move of Esso headquarters to Rueil.

There are about 850 service sector companies located in Rueil, 70 of which employ more than 100 people. A business district called Rueil-sur-Seine (previously known as "Rueil 2000") was created near the RER A Rueil-Malmaison station to accommodate these companies. The business district is equipped with a fiber-optic network.

Several major French companies have their world headquarters in Rueil-Malmaison, such as Schneider Electric and VINCI. Schneider had its head office in Rueil-Malmaison since 2000; previously the building Schneider occupies housed the Schneider subsidiary Télémécanique.

Several large international companies have also located their French headquarters in Rueil-Malmaison, such as ExxonMobil, AstraZeneca, American Express and Unilever.

Infrastructure

Transportation
Rueil-Malmaison is served by Rueil-Malmaison station on RER A. In the future, the commune will be served by Rueil – Suresnes – Mont Valérien station on Line 15 of the Grand Paris Express (GPE), which will be located on the border with the commune of Suresnes, as well as a western extension of Île-de-France tramway Line 1.

Healthcare
The Stell Hospital, a teaching hospital of Sorbonne University, is located in Rueil-Malmaison.

Education
Public schools:
 15 preschools
 15 elementary schools
 Six junior high schools: Les Bons-Raisins, Henri-Dunant, La Malmaison, Les Martinets, Marcel-Pagnol, Jules-Verne
 Two senior high schools: Lycée Richelieu, Lycée polyvalent Gustave-Eiffel

Private schools:
 
 Collège et lycée Madeleine-Daniélou
 Collège Notre-Dame
 École maternelle et élémentaire Saint-Charles-Notre Dame
 Ecole maternelle élémentaire Charles-Peguy
 Ecole Montessori Bilingue de Rueil-Malmaison

There are tertiary educational institutions in the area.

Engineering College:
 IFP School

Notable residents

Jean-Marie Le Pen and his wife, Jany Le Pen, used to live in a two-story house on Rue Hortense
N'Golo Kanté grew up in a small flat with his family in Rueil-Malmaison

Twin towns and sister cities

Rueil-Malmaison is twinned with:

 Ávila, Spain
 Bad Soden, Germany
 Le Bardo, Tunisia
 Bukhara, Uzbekistan, since 1999
 Dubrovnik, Croatia, since 2011
 Elmbridge, England, United Kingdom
 Fribourg, Switzerland
 Helsingør, Denmark
 Jelgava, Latvia, since 2006
 Kiryat Malakhi, Israel, since 1985
 Kitzbühel, Austria, since 1979
 Lynchburg, United States
 Oaxaca, Mexico
 Sarajevo, Bosnia and Herzegovina
 Sergiyev Posad, Russia, since 1989
 Timișoara, Romania
 Tōgane, Japan, since 1990
 Zouk Mikael, Lebanon, since 2009

See also

Communes of the Hauts-de-Seine department
 List of works by Eugène Guillaume

References

External links

Rueil-Malmaison Official website 
official Tourist Board of Rueil Malmaison

Communes of Hauts-de-Seine